The backyard ultra is a form of ultramarathon race where competitors must consecutively run the distance of 6,706 meters (4.167 miles) in less than one hour. The race is over when only one runner remains to complete a lap. This runner is marked as the winner and only finisher, with all other runners receiving a "DNF" (Did Not Finish). There is no predetermined end length or time in a backyard ultra, and the race continues as long as multiple runners can complete the loop within an hour.

History 
Backyard ultras are the invention of Gary "Lazarus Lake" Cantrell, who is also one of the founders and race directors of the Barkley Marathons. The original backyard ultra is Big Dog's Backyard Ultra, which is held on his property in Bell Buckle, Tennessee and is named after his dog. Today, Big's is an invitational race where the top competitors participate based on wins in a bracket of the various American and international backyard ultras.

Description
Exactly one hour after a backyard ultra's first starting time, the competitors run  with a one-hour window to finish. These laps are repeated hourly. The race is won when a single runner successfully completes a lap alone. If no competitor manages one more lap than the others, then all athletes receive a DNF and there is no winner.

The distance the runners race each hour is set at  miles or 6705.6 meters, which is then rounded up to 6706 meters. The total distance run by a competitor who completes 24 laps is exactly 100 miles. Backyard ultra races are usually held on a loop measuring 6706 meters, though in Sweden some have been held on a 400-meter track.

Records
The longest distance recorded by a competitor in a backyard ultra event is 101 laps (677.26 km or 420.83 miles) achieved by Belgium runners Merijn Geerts and Ivo Steyaert during the 2022 Backyard Ultra World Team Championships in October at their team’s home course in Belgium. The pair of Belgium runners did not continue to attempt a 102nd yard, so technically the race did not have a winner. The previous world record was already held by Geerts who ran 90 laps (603.504 km or 375.0 miles) at "The Race of the Champions -  Backyard Masters" in Rettert in Germany in May 2022. Peter Cromie holds the record for most 100+ mile finishes at 7 (4 at 100, 2 at 150 and 1 at 200).

The longest distance recorded by a female competitor in a backyard ultra event is 68 laps by Courtney Dauwalter at Big's Backyard Ultra in October 2020. In May 2019, Katie Wright became the first woman to win a backyard ultra event running  in 30 hours during an event in New Zealand. She beat 5 other women and 40 men to emerge victoriously. Then, Maggie Guterl went on to win the Big's Backyard Ultra covering more than 402 km in 60 loops.

References

External links 
 The official Backyard Ultra website 

Ultramarathons
Endurance games
Long-distance running